Somsak Kosaisuuk (Thai script: สมศักดิ์ โกศัยสุข; born 2 March 1945) is a Thai union official and politician.

He was the Secretary-General of the State Enterprise Labour Relations Confederation (SELRC), a union of government owned enterprises' employees, and in this position very active in organizing a campaign against the privatization of the Electricity Generating Authority of Thailand. Currently, he is an adviser to the union.

Kosaisuuk was one of the five leaders of the People's Alliance for Democracy (PAD). When the PAD registered a political party, the New Politics Party (NPP), Somsak became its chairman. In late April 2011, he resigned from the PAD leadership in a split that separated the PAD from the NPP.

According to a poll conducted by Angus Reid Public Opinion during September 2010, Kosaisuuk was named the least liked politician in Thailand.

References 

Living people
Somsak Kosaisuuk
Somsak Kosaisuuk
Thai trade union leaders
Somsak Kosaisuuk
1945 births